The seal of Tripoli is the official emblem of Libya's capital, Tripoli.

Design
The seal's design consist of a golden ship which represent the importance of the city as a port.

Old design

Before 2011 the seal's design consisted of a ship whose sails are representative of Muammar Gaddafi's The Green Book. The waves are those of the Mediterranean sea and the castle in the background is the Assaraya al Hamraa (Red Castle).

References 

Tripoli, Libya
Seals of cities and towns